The second season of Wildflower, a Philippine revenge drama television series on ABS-CBN, premiered on May 29, 2017 on ABS-CBN's Primetime Bida evening block and worldwide on The Filipino Channel and concluded on August 11, 2017, with a total of 54 episodes. The series stars the Dance Princess Maja Salvador, as Lily Cruz and Ivy Aguas, together with an ensemble cast consisting of Tirso Cruz III, Aiko Melendez, Sunshine Cruz, Wendell Ramos, Vin Abrenica, RK Bagatsing, and Joseph Marco.

Plot 
Ivy (Maja Salvador) painstakingly executes her intricate plan to bring down the Ardientes: First, Ivy seduces their weakest link, Arnaldo (RK Bagatsing). He becomes obsessed with her while she drives him crazy until he finally commits suicide in front of Lily at the resort where the newly married Torillos are honeymooning. Second, she ingratiates herself with Emilia (Aiko Melendez) and then exposes her for plunder, stripping her of her position. After several retaliatory attempts by Emilia against Ivy fails, Emilia is committed to a psychiatric facility; Third, she unseats Julio Ardiente (Tirso Cruz III) from his reelected Governor seat and weakens his powerhold in the province and then robs him of the only person he loves, his grandson Arnoldo. Ivy steadily chips away at what once was the Ardientes' impregnable wall allowing them to rule with impunity.

Cast and characters

Main 
 Maja Salvador as Lily Cruz / Ivy P. Aguas
 Tirso Cruz III as Julio Ardiente
 Aiko Melendez as Emilia Ardiente-Torillo
 Sunshine Cruz as Camia Delos Santos-Cruz
 Wendell Ramos as Raul Torillo / Fake Jaguar
 Vin Abrenica as Jepoy Madrigal
 RK Bagatsing as Arnaldo Ardiente Torillo
 Joseph Marco as Diego Torillo

Supporting 
 Roxanne Barcelo as Natalie Alcantara
 Malou de Guzman as Lorena "Loring" Cervantes
 Bodjie Pascua as Leopando "Pandoy" Cervantes
 Isay Alvarez-Seña as Clarita "Claire" De Guzman
 Ana Abad Santos as Carlotta Navarro
 Ingrid dela Paz as Nimfa Naig
 Arnold Reyes as Arthur Vergara
 Sheila Valderrama as Atty. Georgina Fisher
 Yen Santos as Rosana "Ana" Navarro / Fake Lily Cruz
 Miko Raval as Marlon Cabrera

Recurring 
 Raul Montessa as Fernan Naig
 Vivo Ouano as Raul's ally
 June Macasaet as Raul's ally
 Prince De Guzman as Raul's ally
 Angelo Ilagan as Raul's ally

Guest 
 Rodolfo Madrigal Jr. as Portunato "Pot" David
 Anthony Taberna as Himself
 Dolores Bunoan as Belen
 Rolly Innocencio as Witness

Special guest 
 Kyline Alcantara / Jennica Garcia as Young Emilia Ardiente
 Joseph Andre Garcia as Young Raul Torillo
 Mutya Orquia as Young Rosana "Ana" Navarro
 Ellen Adarna as Young Esmeralda De Guzman-Ardiente

Episodes

References

External links

References 

Wildflower (TV series)
2017 Philippine television seasons